The 1985 NCAA Division III men's basketball tournament was the 11th annual single-elimination tournament to determine the national champions of National Collegiate Athletic Association (NCAA) men's Division III collegiate basketball in the United States.

Held during March 1985, the field included 32 teams and the final championship rounds were contested at Calvin College in Grand Rapids, Michigan.

North Park defeated SUNY Potsdam, 72–71, to claim their fourth NCAA Division III national title.

Tournament bracket

Regional No. 1

Regional No. 2

Regional No. 3

Regional No. 4

Regional No. 5

Regional No. 6

Regional No. 7

Regional No. 8

National Quarterfinals

See also
1985 NCAA Division I men's basketball tournament
1985 NCAA Division II men's basketball tournament
1985 NCAA Division III women's basketball tournament
1985 NAIA men's basketball tournament

References

NCAA Division III men's basketball tournament
NCAA Men's Division III Basketball
Ncaa Tournament
NCAA Division III basketball tournament